Western Samoa competed in the Olympic Games for the first time at the 1984 Summer Olympics in Los Angeles, United States.

Results by event

Athletics
Men's Shot Put
 Henry Smith
 Qualifying Round — 16.09 m (→ did not advance, 19th place)

Men's Discus
 Henry Smith
 Qualifying Round — 51.90 m (→ did not advance, 17th place)

Weightlifting
Men's 90 kg class
 Emile Huch
 Snatch — 117.5kg (25th place)
 C&J —    152.5kg (21st place)
 Total —  260.0kg (22nd place)

Men's 100 kg class
 Sione Sialaoa
 Snatch — 125.0kg (14th place)
 C&J —    155.0kg (11th place)
 Total —  270.0kg (11th place)

References

Official Olympic Reports

Nations at the 1984 Summer Olympics
1984
1984 in Samoa